The Women's 800 metres at the 2011 World Championships in Athletics was held at the Daegu Stadium on September 1, 2 and 4.

The three fastest times prior to the championships were all run at the Russian national trials, with Mariya Savinova leading the rankings with 1:56.95 minutes, followed by Yuliya Rusanova and Ekaterina Kostetskaya. However, Kenia Sinclair of Jamaica and Britain's Jenny Meadows had been the leading athletes on the Diamond League circuit. Caster Semenya, the 2009 champion, was among the fastest that year, but had been affected by injury and an 11-month career break due to gender verification tests. Moroccan Halima Hachlaf and American champion Alysia Johnson Montano were highly ranked, while reigning Olympic and World silver medallist Janeth Jepkosgei was another prominent competitor.

It took under 1:59 just to make the final.  Led by defending champion, Semenya, the three Russians all qualified, along with two Americans, returning silver medalist Jepkosgei and Kenia Sinclair, leaving previous Bronze medalist Jenny Meadows as the fastest non-qualifier.

In the final, Jepkosgei led through a fast 55.86-second first lap, followed by Sinclair and Alysia Johnson Montaño.  On the backstretch, defending champion Semenya cruised past the field taking the lead with about 180 metres to go.  She continued to pull away, but not emphatically.  Savinova had trailed the field and followed Semenya as she moved up, then kicked it into gear on the final straight, easing past Semenya without challenge.  Montaño took a dive at the finish line but was unable to beat Jepkosgei for third place.

On 28 July 2014, IAAF announced that 5th place finisher Kostetskaya was sanctioned for doping after her biological passport had showed abnormalities.  Her result was disqualified.  On February 10, 2017 the Court of Arbitration for Sport (Cas) officially disqualified Savinova's results backdated to July 2010.  When medals were reallocated, everyone moved up.

Medalists

Records
Prior to the competition, the records were as follows:

Qualification standards

Schedule

Results

Heats
Qualification: First 4 in each heat (Q) and the next 4 fastest (q) advance to the semifinals.

Semifinals
Qualification: First 2 in each heat (Q) and the next 2 fastest (q) advance to the final.

Final

References

External links
800 metres results at IAAF website

800
800 metres at the World Athletics Championships
2011 in women's athletics